Joseph Brackett Jr. (May 6, 1797 – July 4, 1882) was an American songwriter, author, and elder of The United Society of Believers in Christ's Second Appearing, better known as the Shakers. The most famous song attributed to Brackett, "Simple Gifts", is still widely performed and adapted.

Biography
Brackett was born in Cumberland, Maine, on May 6, 1797, as Elisha Brackett. When he was 10, his first name was changed to Joseph, like his father's, as the Bracketts joined the short-lived Shaker community in Gorham, Maine.  This new Shaker community was centered on the Bracketts' property, until the whole group moved to Poland Hill, Maine, in 1819. Brackett's father died there on July 27, 1838, but Brackett continued to rise in the Shaker community, eventually becoming the head of the society in Maine.

Brackett died in the Shaker community of Sabbathday Lake at New Gloucester, Maine, on July 4, 1882.

Legacy
Brackett is known today primarily as the presumed author of the Shaker dancing song "Simple Gifts", which has become an internationally loved tune, both through his original version and many of its adaptations. There are two conflicting narratives of Shaker origin as to the composer of the song. One account attributes the song to a "Negro spirit" heard at Canterbury, New Hampshire, which would make the song a "gift song" received by a Shaker from the spirit world. Alternatively, and far more widely accepted, the song's composer is said to be Brackett. The song, written in 1848, was largely unknown outside of Shaker communities until Aaron Copland used the melody in his 1944 composition Appalachian Spring. The tune is also known widely through the lyrics "Lord of the Dance", written by Sydney Carter in 1963. The "Tune Lovers Society", an online organization designed to preserve and protect American tunes from the past, sponsors a birthday commemoration for Brackett on May 6.

References

External links 

 Joseph Brackett and Simple Gifts
 Sabbathday Lake Shaker Village
 
 Joseph Brackett Remembrance
 

1797 births
1882 deaths
People from Cumberland, Maine
Songwriters from Maine
People from New Gloucester, Maine
19th-century American musicians
Folk musicians from Maine
Shaker members